XWA is a British professional wrestling promotion, based in the English south east town of Sudbury, Suffolk, dealing primarily in the professional wrestling industry. The XWA was formed in March 2007, following the demise of the Frontier Wrestling Alliance, when Greg Lambert formed the new promotion from its ashes and continues to run quarterly events in Morecambe, using FWA titles, some former FWA talent and a lot of new, local, talent. XWA's business focus is on professional wrestling.

History

Formation and Closure (2007–2012)
Following the closure of the Frontier Wrestling Alliance (FWA) after FWA v IPW:UK Final Frontiers at Orpington Halls, Kent on 25 March 2007, Greg Lambert called a press conference announcing that he was unhappy with the circumstances of the FWA's defeat, blaming Robbie Brookside for interfering and costing Flash Barker the Losing Promotion Must Close match with IPW representative Martin Stone. Lambert stated that he intended to start a new promotion, the XWA. In reality, Lambert had wanted to change the name of the promotion from FWA to XWA so he could run the promotion as a storyline-based, family-friendly product centred on its British stars, rather than the more 'American indie-style' company geared towards young adults and with a heavy reliance on overseas imports which the FWA had always been. In summer 2006, Lambert and his business partner Mark Kay agreed to 'put IPW:UK over' in a promotion versus promotion feud to give IPW a boost, and also to give a storyline reason for the demise of the FWA so they could make a completely fresh start.

The new promotion was named 'XWA' because it was close enough to the original name to ensure some semblance of continuity for their regular fans in Morecambe. Lambert said when the promotion was formed that the XWA stood for high quality British wrestling featuring the cream of UK wrestling talent on shows in the best UK wrestling venue (The Morecambe Dome) in front of the hottest crowd in UK wrestling, and also stood for the desire to keep the name of the FWA alive.

To this end, Lambert and Kay continued storylines in Morecambe where they left off when they promoted the first ever XWA show, XWA War on the Shore, on 7 April 2007. The last FWA British Heavyweight Champion, Robbie Brookside, was recognised as XWA British Heavyweight Champion. FWA Flyweight Champion Ross Jordan was now recognised as XWA British Flyweight Champion. However, other former FWA titles did not fall under the banner of the XWA. The XWA has also continued with names of live events that were formerly used by the FWA, such as Vendetta, Goldrush and War on the Shore.

On 11 April 2009 at XWA War on the Shore V, former FWA owner 'The Showstealer' Alex Shane made his return to the Morecambe Dome after a three and a half-year absence. In an angle, British Heavyweight Champion Sam Slam handed Alex the old FWA Heavyweight Title belt which the XWA had continued to use as its main title belt ever since the XWA was formed. In exchange, Shane handed Slam the brand new XWA Title belt. This angle was conceived so Shane could once again take possession of the FWA Title belt ahead of the reformation of the FWA, which was announced a week afterward and also to 'pass the torch' to Slam.

In July 2012 the XWA lost an inter-promotional feud to the North-West promotion Grand Pro Wrestling after XWA roster member Joey Hayes turned on his XWA teammates Rockstar Spud, Jack Clarke, Jynx and XWA British Heavyweight Champion Johnny Phere, giving the GPW team victory in the final elimination tag team contest. The betrayal of Joey Hayes and subsequent loss of his second inter-promotional feud lead to Greg Lambert spiral into depression, cancel all future XWA events and vacating all XWA Championship belts in order to save them from appearing on lesser promotions events.

The cancellation of XWA events led to fans nationwide launching "Bring Back The XWA" Facebook groups, pages and petitions in order to convince the Powerslam journalist to bring back one of the UK's leading professional wrestling promotions but to no avail.

Revival (2014–present)
On 22 August 2014, Greg Lambert released a video of a telephone conversation between him and an unnamed person that revealed he had sold the XWA on and that the promotion was returning on 31 October. The conversation ended with Lambert stating not to mess it up for he'll be watching.

On 13 October, XWA released a video of Kay Lee Ray issuing an open challenge for XWA Please Don't Die on 1 November in Colchester. On 26 October The Suicidal, Suicidal, Suicidal Jimmy Havoc answered the challenge but added the stipulation of 'No Rules'.

On 31 October, XWA returned to The Delphi Centre in Sudbury, Suffolk for their first event in 2 years. Featured on this show was an 8-man tournament for the then vacant XWA British Heavyweight Championship. With Martin Stone defeating 'Loco' Mike Mason, Doug Williams defeating Jimmy Havoc, Damian O'Connor defeating Sam 'Slam' Naylor and James Castle defeating Lord Gideon Grey in a casket match. After the casket match, a dissatisfied Jimmy Havoc attacked James Castle taking him out of the title picture and entering himself back into the four way final. In non-tournament action, Pro-Wrestling: EVE Champion Nikki Storm defeated Kay Lee Ray after interference from Jimmy Havoc. In the four way final for the XWA British Heavyweight Championship Damian O'Connor defeated Jimmy Havoc after Kay Lee Ray returned the favour by interfering in his match.

At their next event 'Please Don't Die' on 1 November at the Liquid and Envy nightclub in Colchester, Essex. Nikki Storm successfully defended her Pro-wrestling: EVE Championship against Pollyanna, Damian O'Connor also successfully defended his XWA British Heavyweight Championship against both Paul London and Martin Stone and Kay Lee Ray defeated Jimmy Havoc in a No Rules match.

On 29 November, XWA made its debut at the Evoke nightclub in Chelmsford, Essex for 'We Need A Hero' Damian O'Connor defended the XWA British Heavyweight Championship against Chris Hero and Rhia O'Reilly won the Pro-Wrestling: EVE Championship from Nikki Storm in a No DQ match.

XWA returned to The Deplhi Centre in Sudbury, Suffolk on 6 February 2015 for 'Goldrush'. Damian O'Connor vs James Castle for the XWA British Heavyweight Championship ended in a no contest after Jimmy Havoc attacked both men with a chair. Rhia O'Reilly successfully defended the Pro-Wrestling: EVE Championship against Nikki Storm, And Jimmy Havoc won the Goldrush Rumble for a future championship match.

Training centre
The XWA opened its first training centre at Regent Park Studios, Morecambe, in January 2009. The head trainer was formerly 'Deadly' Damon Leigh, who has stepped back from training due to responsibilities in his work as a Police Community Support officer. Training at the Morecambe school is now headed up by Dave Rayne who also teaches at the Manchester-based FutureShock School. The Centres are part of the British Wrestling Council. A second training school opened in Ipswich, Suffolk, in April 2009 under the management of Dann Read and head trainer Ashe.

DVDs
The XWA released its first ever DVD, XWA War on the Shore V, on 4 July 2009, featuring commentary by Greg Lambert and Stallion.

Most recently they have released the event 'Please Don't Die' onto DVD, which is available at shows or through their Facebook store.

Championships

Current champions

Other accomplishments

See also

Professional wrestling in the United Kingdom
List of professional wrestling promotions in the United Kingdom

References

External links

 
British professional wrestling promotions
2007 establishments in the United Kingdom
Entertainment companies established in 2007
Sport in Suffolk